The UL enterprise is a global safety science company headquartered in Northbrook, Illinois, composed of three organizations, UL Research Institutes, UL Standards & Engagement and UL Solutions.

Established in 1894, the UL enterprise was founded as the Underwriters' Electrical Bureau (a bureau of the National Board of Fire Underwriters), and was known throughout the 20th century as Underwriters Laboratories. On January 1, 2012, Underwriters Laboratories became the parent company of a for-profit company in the U.S named UL LLC, a limited liability corporation, which took over the product testing and certification business. On June 26, 2022, the companies rebranded into three distinct organizations that make up the UL enterprise. 

UL Solutions partners with customers and stakeholders in more than 100 countries to help solve safety, security and sustainability challenges and is also responsible for managing and issuing the highly respected portfolio of UL Marks. The company is one of several companies approved to perform safety testing by the U.S. federal agency Occupational Safety and Health Administration (OSHA). OSHA maintains a list of approved testing laboratories, which are known as Nationally Recognized Testing Laboratories. According to Lifehacker, UL Solutions is the best known product safety and certification organization globally.

History 

Underwriters Laboratories Inc. was founded in 1894 by William Henry Merrill. After graduating from the Massachusetts Institute of Technology (MIT) with a degree in electrical engineering in 1889, Merrill went to work as an electrical inspector for the Boston Board of Fire Underwriters. At the turn of the twentieth century, fire loss was on the rise in the United States, and the increasing use of electricity in homes and businesses posed a serious threat to property and human life.

In order to determine and mitigate risk, Merrill proposed to open a laboratory where he would use scientific principles to test products for fire and electrical safety. The Boston Board of Fire Underwriters turned this idea down, however, perhaps due to Merrill's youth and relative inexperience at the time.

In May 1893, Merrill moved to Chicago to work for the Chicago Fire Underwriters' Association. His task was to inspect the city's fire alarm systems. He was also sent to the 1893 World's Fair to inspect the Fair's electrical installations and the Palace of Electricity. In order to determine and mitigate risk in his role as an electrical inspector, Merrill found it necessary to conduct tests on building materials and electrical components. Upon seeing a growing potential in this field, Merrill stayed in Chicago to found Underwriters Laboratories. He received initial funding from the Chicago Fire Underwriters' Association and the Western Insurance Union, a local insurance organization. With $350 of equipment, he opened a small laboratory on the third floor of a local fire insurance patrol station, signing UL's first test report on March 24, 1894.

Merrill soon went to work on developing safety standards, conducting tests, and uncovering hazards. In the early years, UL tested three main types of products: devices meant to stop fire (such as fire extinguishers), devices meant to resist fire (such as fire doors), and devices that frequently caused fire (like wires used for electrical installations). This work soon expanded, and throughout the twentieth century, UL certified many pivotal consumer technologies, such as vacuum cleaners, televisions, microwaves, personal computers, and more.

UL published its first standard, "Tin Clad Fire Doors", in 1903. In 1906, UL established a Label Service for certain product categories that require more frequent inspections. Products that passed UL's testing and regular inspections were given a UL label, which eventually evolved into the UL Mark. From 1905 to 1979, UL Headquarters was located at 207-231 East Ohio Street in Chicago. In 1979, the organization moved its headquarters to a 153-acre campus in Northbrook, Illinois, 25 miles north of its former downtown Chicago location.

UL Solutions has evolved from its roots in electrical and fire safety to address broader safety issues, such as hazardous substances, water quality, food safety, performance testing, safety and compliance education, and environmental sustainability.

On January 1, 2012, Underwriters Laboratories became the parent company of a for-profit company in the U.S named UL LLC, a limited liability corporation. The for-profit company took over the product testing and certification business.

In 2022, the company revised their go-to-market strategy to include three separate organizations - UL Solutions, UL Standards & Engagement, and UL Research Institutes.

UL Standards

Sustainability Standards 
 UL 106, Standard for Sustainability for Luminaires (under development)
 UL 110, Standard for Sustainability for Mobile Phones

Standards for Electrical and Electronic Products 
 UL 50, Enclosures for Electrical Equipment
 UL 50E, Enclosures for Electrical Equipment, Environmental Considerations
 UL 153, Portable Electric Lamps
 UL 197, Commercial Electrical Cooking Appliances
 UL 244B, Field Installed and/or Field Connected Appliance Controls
 UL 410, Slip Resistance of Floor Surface Materials
 UL 796, Printed-Wiring Boards
 UL 916, Energy Management Equipment
 UL 962, Household and Commercial Furnishings
 UL 962A, Furniture Power Distribution Units
 UL 962B, Outline for Merchandise Display and Rack Mounted Power Distribution Units
 UL 970, Retail Fixtures and Merchandising Displays
 UL 1026, Electric Household Cooking and Food Serving Appliances
 UL 1492, Audio/Video Products and Accessories
 UL 1598, Luminaires
 UL 1642, Lithium Batteries
 UL 1995, Heating and Cooling Equipment
 UL 2267 Standard for Safety - Fuel Cell Power Systems for Installation in Industrial Electric Trucks
 UL 6500, Audio/Video and Musical Instrument Apparatuses for Household, Commercial and Similar General Uses
 UL 60065, Audio, Video and Similar Electronic Apparatuses: Safety Requirements
 UL 60335-1, Household and Similar Electrical Appliances, Part 1: General Requirements
 UL 60335-2-24, Household and Similar Electrical Appliances, Part 2: Particular Requirements for Motor Compressors
 UL 60335-2-3, Household and Similar Electrical Appliances, Part 2: Particular Requirements for Electric Irons
 UL 60335-2-34, Household and Similar Electrical Appliances, Part 2: Particular Requirements for Motor Compressors
 UL 60335-2-8, Household and Similar Electrical Appliances, Part 2: Particular Requirements for Shavers, Hair Clippers and Similar Appliances
 UL 60950, Information Technology Equipment
 UL 60950-1, Information Technology Equipment – Safety, Part 1: General Requirements
 UL 60950-21, Information Technology Equipment – Safety, Part 21: Remote Power Feeding
 UL 60950-22, Information Technology Equipment – Safety, Part 22: Equipment to be Installed Outdoors
 UL 60950-23, Information Technology Equipment – Safety, Part 23: Large Data Storage Equipment
 UL 62368-1, Audio/Video, Information and Communication Technology Equipment – Part 1: Safety Requirements

Life Safety Standards 
 UL 217, Single- and Multiple- Station Smoke Alarms
 UL 268, Smoke Detectors for Fire Protective Signaling Systems
 UL 268A, Smoke Detectors for Duct Application
 UL 1626, Residential Sprinklers for Fire Protection Service
 UL 1971, Signaling Devices for the Hearing Impaired

Standards for Building Products 
 UL 10A, Tin-Clad Fire Doors
 UL 20, General-Use Snap Switches
 UL 486E, Equipment Wiring Terminals for Use with Aluminum and/or Copper Conductors
 UL 1256, Fire Test of Roof/Deck Constructions

Standards for Industrial Control Equipment 
 UL 508, Industrial Control Equipment, superseded by UL 60947-4-1
 UL 508A, Industrial Control Panels
 UL 508C, Power Conversion Equipment, superseded by UL 61800-5-1
 UL 61800-5-1, Adjustable Speed Electrical Power Drive Systems

Standards for Plastic Materials 
 UL 94, Tests for Flammability of Plastic Materials for Parts in Devices and Appliances
 UL 746A, Polymeric Materials: Short-Term Property Evaluations
 UL 746B, Polymeric Materials: Long-Term Property Evaluations
 UL 746C, Polymeric Materials: Use in Electrical Equipment Evaluations.
 UL 746D, Polymeric Materials: Fabricated Parts
 UL 746E, Polymeric Materials: Industrial Laminates, Filament Wound Tubing, Vulcanized Fiber and Materials Used in Printed-Wiring Boards
 UL 746F, Polymeric Materials:  Flexible Dielectric Film Materials for Use in Printed-Wiring Boards and Flexible Materials Interconnect Constructions

Standards for Wire and Cable 
 UL 62, Flexible Cords and Cables
 UL 758, Appliance Wiring Material (AWM)
 UL 817, Cord Sets and Power Supply Cords
 UL 2556, Wire and Cable Test Methods

UL Solutions of Canada 

 CAN/ULC-S101-07, Standard Methods for Fire Endurance Tests of Building Construction and Materials
 CAN/ULC-S102-10, Standard Methods of Test for Surface-Burning Characteristics of Building Materials and Assemblies
 CAN/ULC-S102.2-10, Standard Methods of Test for Surface-Burning Characteristics of Flooring, Floor Coverings, and Miscellaneous Materials and Assemblies
 CAN/ULC-S104-10, Standard Methods for Fire Tests of Door Assemblies
 CAN/ULC-S107-10, Standard Methods for Fire Tests of Roof Coverings
 CAN/ULC-S303-M91 (R1999), Standard Methods for Local Burglar Alarm Units and Systems

Photovoltaic 
 UL 1703, Photovoltaic Flat-Plate Modules
 UL 1741, Inverters, Converters, Controllers and Interconnection System Equipment for Use With Distributed Energy Resources
 UL 2703, Rack Mounting Systems and Clamping Devices for Flat-Plate Photovoltaic Modules and Panels

Recognized Component Mark

The Recognized Component Mark is a type of safety certification mark issued by UL Solutions. It is placed on components which are intended to be part of a UL certified end product, but which cannot bear the full UL Mark themselves. The general public does not ordinarily come across it, as it is borne on components which make up finished products.

Computer benchmarking 
UL offers the following computer benchmarking products:
 3DMark
 Easy Benchmark Automation
 PCMark 10
 PCMark for Android
 Servermark
 Testdriver
 UL Procyon AI Inference Benchmark
 UL Procyon Photo Editing Benchmark
 UL Procyon Video Editing Benchmark
 VRMark

Similar organizations 
 Applied Research Laboratories (ARL)
 A competing testing laboratory, based in Florida, U.S.
 Bureau Veritas
 A competing test, inspection, and certification company.
Baseefa
 A similar organization in the United Kingdom.
 Canadian Standards Association (CSA)
 A similar organization in Canada. Also serves as a competitive alternative for U.S. products.
 CCOE
 Chief Controller of Explosives
 CEBEC
 Testing laboratory, inspection, and certification company, based in Brussels, Belgium.
 DNV GL
 A global testing laboratory, inspection, certification, marine class, and engineering organisation, headquartered in Høvik, Norway.
 Efectis
 A similar organization in Europe, fire science expert, testing laboratory, and certification body.
 ETL SEMKO
 A competing testing laboratory, part of Intertek; based in London, U.K.
 FM Approvals
 A competing certification body, based in Rhode Island, U.S.
 ICC-ES
 International Code Council Evaluation Services.
 IAPMO R&T
 A competing certification body, based in Ontario, California, U.S.
 INERIS
 Testing laboratory, inspection, and certification company, based in France.
 KFI
 The Korea Fire Institute, a similar organization in Korea.
 MET Laboratories, Inc.
 A competing testing laboratory, based in Baltimore, Maryland, U.S.
 MiCOM Labs (MiCOM)
 A consumer, wireless, telecom, IT, medical, and aerospace industry, testing, and certification laboratory, based in Pleasanton, California, U.S.
 NTA Inc
 A certification agency based in Nappanee, Indiana, U.S.
 QAI Laboratories (QAI)
 A competing certification body, with locations in Canada (Vancouver, BC - HQ and Vaughan, ON); United States (Rancho Cucamonga, CA and Tulsa, OK); Seoul, South Korea; and Shanghai, China.
 QPS Evaluation Services
 A competing testing and certification body for product safety (NRTL, ATEX, IECEx, CB Scheme and Field Evaluations).
 Sira
 A similar organization for the UK/Europe.
 GS
 Geprüfte Sicherheit
 TÜV
 German and Austrian approvals organizations.
 Cardno PPI
 A similar third party organization, with offices in Houston, Texas, U.S.; Lafayette, LA, U.S.; London, U.K.; and Perth, Australia.

See also 

 ANSI
 CE marking
 Conformance mark
 Consumer Reports
 Consumers Union
 Fire test
 Good Housekeeping Seal
 National Sanitation Foundation
 NEMKO
 Product certification
 Quality control
 RoHS
 Safety engineering
 Société Générale de Surveillance

References

External links

 
 List of US NRTLs at OSHA

Certification marks
Commercial laboratories
Companies based in Northbrook, Illinois
Electrical safety standards organizations
Laboratories in the United States
Organizations established in 1894
Product-testing organizations
Standards organizations in the United States
1894 establishments in the United States